Karst plateau may refer to:

 Karst Plateau
 Any of the karst plateaus in :Category:Karst plateaus